Serincia is a genus of moths in the subfamily Arctiinae. The genus was erected by Harrison Gray Dyar Jr. in 1914.

Species
 Serincia lineata Reich, 1933
 Serincia metallica Dyar, 1914

References

Lithosiini